Tarsicio Aguado Arriazu, sometimes known as Tarsi (born 16 October 1994), is a Spanish professional footballer who plays as a midfielder for Cultural y Deportiva Leonesa.

Club career
Born in Murchante, Navarre, Tarsi graduated from Real Zaragoza's youth setup, after stints with UDA Gramenet, RCD Espanyol and CF Badalona. He made his senior debuts with the former's reserves in the 2012–13 campaign, in Segunda División B.

On 20 January 2013 Tarsi played his first match as a professional, replacing injured Apoño in the 27th minute of a 0–2 La Liga loss at Real Valladolid.

On 12 July 2016, after being released by the Aragonese side, he signed a two-year deal with Athletic Bilbao. After two seasons as a regular with the reserves, he was released by Athletic Bilbao when his contract expired in July 2018.

On 31 July 2021, he joined to Primera División RFEF club Calahorra.

Personal life
His father, also known as Tarsi, played as a midfielder in the 1980s and 90s, mainly for clubs in the Catalonia region.

References

External links

1994 births
Living people
Spanish footballers
Footballers from Navarre
Association football midfielders
La Liga players
Segunda División players
Segunda División B players
Primera Federación players
Tercera División players
Real Zaragoza B players
Real Zaragoza players
Bilbao Athletic footballers
Real Balompédica Linense footballers
Real Oviedo Vetusta players
CD Calahorra players